{{DISPLAYTITLE:C28H34O15}}
The molecular formula C28H34O15 (molar mass: 610.56 g/mol, exact mass: 610.1898 u) may refer to:

 Hesperidin
 Neohesperidin